The 1935 North Dakota Fighting Sioux football team, also known as the Nodaks, was an American football team that represented the University of North Dakota in the North Central Conference (NCC) during the 1935 college football season. In their eighth year under head coach Charles A. West, the Fighting Sioux compiled a 6–2–2 record (3–0–2 against NCC opponents), finished in second place out of seven teams in the NCC, and outscored opponents by a total of 165 to 78.

Schedule

References

North Dakota
North Dakota Fighting Hawks football seasons
North Dakota Fighting Sioux football